Big Sounds of the Drags is the second album by Junkie XL, released on Roadrunner Records in 1999.

Reception 

The tracks "Synasthesia", "Dance USA" and "Future in Computer Hell (Part II)" were included in the video games Test Drive: Overdrive (2002), and "Action Radius" in Need for Speed: Underground (2003). "Action Radius" was released as a single upon its re-release in 2000. "Zerotonine" was played over the end credits of the 2002 motion picture Buying the Cow.

Track listing

1999 edition 
 "Check Your Basic Groove" (5:09)
 "Action Radius" (3:53)
 "Synasthesia" (7:41)
 "Power of Big Slacks" (3:25)
 "Zerotonine" (4:01)
 "Love Like Razorblade" (6:08)
 "Legion" (4:36)
 "Dance USA" (3:23)
 "Gettin' Lost" (6:18)
 "Black Jack" (3:07)
 "Next Plateau" (5:00)
 "Future in Computer Hell (Part II)" (21:45)

2000 edition
 "Check Your Basic Groove" (5:07)
 "Synasthesia" (7:42)
 "Power of Big Slacks" (3:25)
 "Zerotonine" (4:02)
 "Love Like Razorblade" (6:07)
 "Legion" (4:36)
 "Disco 2000" (4:26)
 "Future in Computer Hell (Part II)" (7:16)
 "Bon Voyage" (7:05)
 "Power of Big Slacks (Reprise)" (11:06)
 "Gettin' Lost" (7:14)
 "Black Jack" (3:08)
 "Next Plateau" (4:51)

Personnel

Junkie XL
 Tom Holkenborg – producer, writer (except for tracks 2, 4, 5, 6, 7, 11), engineering, mixing, programming, keyboards, samples, bass
 Patrick Tilon (Silver Surfering Rudeboy) – lead vocals, writing ("Action Radius", "Power of Big Slacks", "Zerotonine", "Love Like Razorblade", "Legion", "Next Plateau")

Additional musicians
 Rene van der Zee - guitars
 John Themis - guitars
 Keeling Lee - guitars
 Max Cavalera - guitars, keyboards
 Dino Cazares - guitars
 Klaas Ten Holt – guitars, strings ("Synthasesia", "Future in Computer Hell (Part 2)") 
 Greg Wilson - turntables
 Baz Mattie – drums
 Guy Moon - drums
 Sander van der Heide – mastering (except for "Power of Big Slacks (reprise)")
 Tim Young – mastering ("Power of Big Slacks (reprise)")

References 

Junkie XL albums
2000 albums